This page documents the tornadoes and tornado outbreaks of 1995, primarily in the United States. Most tornadoes form in the U.S., although some events may take place internationally. Tornado statistics for older years like this often appear significantly lower than modern years due to fewer reports or confirmed tornadoes, but by the 1990s, tornado statistics were coming closer to the numbers seen today.

Synopsis

The season peaked in May with a near-record of 392 tornadoes that month. June brought over 200 tornadoes, including several that became famous for their videos. The death total for the year was relatively low at 30 (fewest since 1986).

Events

Confirmed tornado total for the entire year 1995 in the United States.

January
There were 36 tornadoes confirmed in the United States in January. A total of three people were killed in the Southeast US from separate tornadoes during the month.

February
There were seven tornadoes confirmed in the United States in February. An F3 tornado on February 16 killed six people and injured 130 in Arab, Alabama, making it the tornado responsible for the most deaths in 1995.

March
There were 49 tornadoes confirmed in the United States in March.

April
There were 130 tornadoes confirmed in the United States in April.

May
There were 392 tornadoes confirmed in the United States in May.

May 6–27

A long-lived series of deadly tornado outbreaks occurred throughout almost the entire month of May; 13 deaths occurred due to the outbreaks. Nearly 300 tornadoes, including four that were rated F4, occurred during this period from the Central US through the Southeast and into the Mid-Atlantic.

May 29

An unusual F4 tornado killed three people in Berkshire County, Massachusetts. A car was thrown 1000 ft, which was the basis for the F4 rating.

June
There were 216 tornadoes confirmed in the United States in June.

June 2
An F3 tornado scraped the south side of Friona, Texas before maturing into a major wedge east of town. A dozen injuries were reported, but no fatalities.
  
An F2 tornado near Dimmitt, Texas was covered closely by the Probe 1 Vortex team, making it "the most comprehensively observed tornado in history."
The tornado resulted in 3 injuries.

June 8
Several tornadoes in the Texas Panhandle caused widespread destruction. The Pampa F4 tornado struck the industrial section of the town, featured on several weather and disaster-related documentaries and captured on video. Two other F4 tornadoes near Allison and Kellerville were also captured on video. None of those tornadoes caused any fatalities. The Kellerville tornado has been debated to be of F5 strength, though the final rating was F4.

July
There were 162 tornadoes confirmed in the United States in July.

August
There were 53 tornadoes confirmed in the United States in August.

September
There were 19 tornadoes confirmed in the United States in September.

October
There were 74 tornadoes confirmed in the United States in October.

November
There were 79 tornadoes confirmed in the United States in November.

November 7

A moderate tornado outbreak took place mainly over North Carolina, South Carolina and Georgia, with 41 tornadoes confirmed in total. 28 tornadoes were confirmed in South Carolina alone, which made it the largest tornado outbreak in the state at the time until the Hurricane Frances tornado outbreak in 2004, when 42 tornadoes touched down in that state. A rare, short lived F4 tornado touched down just east of Marion, South Carolina, although the rating is disputed. It would be the last F4/EF4+ tornado confirmed in South Carolina until April 13, 2020.

November 10–11

An F2 tornado killed two people north of Des Arc, Arkansas during the overnight hours of November 11.

December
There were 18 tornadoes confirmed in the United States in December.

See also
 Tornado
 Tornadoes by year
 Tornado records
 Tornado climatology
 Tornado myths
 List of tornado outbreaks
 List of F5 and EF5 tornadoes
 List of North American tornadoes and tornado outbreaks
 List of 21st-century Canadian tornadoes and tornado outbreaks
 List of European tornadoes and tornado outbreaks
 List of tornadoes and tornado outbreaks in Asia
 List of Southern Hemisphere tornadoes and tornado outbreaks
 List of tornadoes striking downtown areas
 Tornado intensity
 Fujita scale
 Enhanced Fujita scale

References

External links 
 U.S. tornadoes in 1995 - Tornado History Project
 Tornadoes of 1995 (The Tornado Project)
 Tornado deaths monthly

 
1995 meteorology
Tornado-related lists by year
Torn